Fingermouse is a British children's television programme created by Michael Cole for the BBC in 1985.  It is a spin-off of the earlier series Fingerbobs. The first episode was broadcast on 25 September 1985 on BBC1. The eponymous star was a paper finger puppet in the form of a mouse, who would play various musical instruments with the help of Music Man, played by Iain Lauchlan. Fingermouse also went adventuring outside, interacting with other paper puppets made by artist Joanne Cole. The episodes were repeated frequently between 1986 and 1994.

Episodes

References

External links
  Fingermouse @ Memorable TV 

BBC children's television shows
British television shows featuring puppetry
1985 British television series debuts
1985 British television series endings
1980s British children's television series
CBeebies
British television spin-offs
Television series about mice and rats
Television series by BBC Studios